Obsessive–compulsive personality disorder (OCPD) is a cluster C personality disorder marked by a spectrum of obsessions with rules, lists, schedules, and order, among other things. Symptoms are usually present by the time a person reaches adulthood, and are visible in a variety of situations. The cause of OCPD is thought to involve a combination of genetic and environmental factors, namely problems with attachment.

This is a distinct disorder from obsessive–compulsive disorder (OCD), and the relation between the two is contentious. Some studies have found high comorbidity rates between the two disorders but others have shown little comorbidity. Both disorders may share outside similarities, such as rigid and ritual-like behaviors. OCPD is highly comorbid with other personality disorders, autism spectrum, eating disorders, anxiety, mood disorders, and substance use disorders.

The disorder is the most common personality disorder in the United States, and is diagnosed twice as often in males as in females; however, there is evidence to suggest the prevalence between men and women is equal.

Signs and symptoms
Obsessive–compulsive personality disorder (OCPD) is marked by an excessive obsession with rules, lists, schedules, and order; a need for perfectionism that interferes with efficiency and the ability to complete tasks; a devotion to productivity that hinders interpersonal relationships and leisure time; rigidity and zealousness on matters of morality and ethics; an inability to delegate responsibilities or work to others; restricted functioning in interpersonal relationships; restricted expression of emotion and affect; and a need for control over one's environment and self.

Some of OCPD's symptoms are persistent and stable, whilst others are unstable. The obsession with perfectionism, reluctance to delegate tasks to others, and rigidity and stubbornness are stable symptoms. On the other hand, the symptoms that were most likely to change over time were the miserly spending style and the excessive devotion to productivity. This discrepancy in the stability of symptoms may lead to mixed results in terms of the course of the disorder, with some studies showing a remission rate of 58% after a 12-month period, whilst others suggesting that the symptoms are stable and may worsen with age.

Attention to order and perfection
People with OCPD tend to be obsessed with controlling their environments; to satisfy this need for control, they become preoccupied with trivial details, lists, procedures, rules, and schedules.

This preoccupation with details and rules makes the person unable to delegate tasks and responsibilities to other people unless they submit to their exact way of completing a task because they believe that there is only one correct way of doing something. They stubbornly insist that a task or job must be completed their way, and only their way, and may micromanage people when they are assigned a group task. They are frustrated when other people suggest alternative methods. A person with this disorder may reject help even when they desperately need it as they believe that only they can do something correctly.

People with OCPD are obsessed with maintaining perfection. The perfectionism and the extremely high standards that they establish are to their detriment and may cause delays and failures to complete objectives and tasks.  Every mistake is thought of as a major catastrophe that will soil their reputation for life. For example, a person may write an essay for a college, and then believe that it fell short of "perfection", so they continue rewriting it until they miss the deadline. They may never complete the essay due to the self-imposed high standards. They are unaware that other people may become frustrated and annoyed by the repeated delays and hassles that this behavior causes. Work relationships may then become a source of tension.

Devotion to productivity
Individuals with OCPD devote themselves to work and productivity at the expense of interpersonal relationships and recreation. Economic necessity, such as poverty, cannot account for this behavior. They may believe that they do not have sufficient time to relax because they have to prioritize their work above all. They may refuse to spend time with friends and family because of that. They may find it difficult to go on a vacation, and even if they book a vacation, they may keep postponing it until it never happens. They may feel uncomfortable when they do go on a vacation and will take something along with them so they can work. They choose hobbies that are organized and structured, and they approach them as a serious task requiring work to perfect. The devotion to productivity in OCPD, however, is distinct from work addiction. OCPD is controlled and egosyntonic, whereas work addiction is uncontrolled and egodystonic, and the affected person may display signs of withdrawal.

Rigidity
Individuals with OCPD are overconscientious, scrupulous and rigid, and inflexible on matters of morality, ethics and other areas of life. They may force themselves and others to follow rigid moral principles and strict standards of performance. They are self-critical and harsh about their mistakes. These symptoms should not be accounted for or caused by a person's culture or religion. Their view of the world is polarised and dichotomous; there is no grey area between what is right and what is wrong. Whenever this dichotomous view of the world cannot be applied to a situation, this causes internal conflict as the person's perfectionist tendencies are challenged.

People with this disorder are so obsessed with doing everything the "right and correct" way that they have a hard time understanding and appreciating the ideas, beliefs, and values of other people, and are reluctant to change their views, especially on matters of morality and politics.

Restricted emotions and interpersonal functioning
Individuals with this disorder may display little affection and warmth; their relationships and speech tend to have a formal and professional approach, and not much affection is expressed even to loved ones, such as greeting or hugging a significant other at an airport or train station.

They are extremely careful in their interpersonal interactions. They have little spontaneity when interacting with others, and ensure that their speech follows rigid and austere standards by excessively scrutinising it. They filter their speech for embarrassing or imperfect articulation, and they have a low bar for what they consider to be such. They lower their bar even further when they are communicating with their superiors or with a person of high status. Communication becomes a time-consuming and exhausting effort, and they start avoiding it altogether. Others regard them as cold and detached as a result.

Their need for restricting affection is a defense mechanism used to control their emotions.  They may expunge emotions from their memories and organize them as a library of facts and data; the memories are intellectualized and rationalized, not experiences that they can feel. This helps them avoid unexpected emotions and feelings and allows them to remain in control. They view self-exploration as a waste of time and have a patronising attitude towards emotional people.

Interpersonal control
Individuals with OCPD are at one extreme of the conscientiousness continuum. While conscientiousness is a desirable trait generally, its extreme presentation for those with OCPD leads to interpersonal problems. OCPD individuals present as over-controlled and this extends to the relationships they have with other people. Individuals with OCPD are referential to authority and rules. OCPD individuals may therefore punish those who violate their strict standards. The inability to accept differences in belief or behaviors from others often leads to high conflict and controlling relationships with coworkers, spouses, and children.

Cause
The cause of OCPD is thought to involve a combination of genetic and environmental factors. There is clear evidence to support the theory that OCPD is genetically inherited; however, the relevance and impact of genetic factors vary with studies placing it somewhere between 27% and 78%.

A Twin Study of Personality Disorders, a study over multiple personality disorders and the influence that genetics play on causing these disorders, found that OCPD had a .78 heritability correlation. Therefore, determining that the development of OCPD in an individual can be strongly linked to genetics.

Other studies have found links between attachment theory and the development of OCPD. According to this hypothesis, those with OCPD have never developed a secure attachment style, had overbearing parents, were shown little care, and were unable to develop empathetically and emotionally.

Diagnosis

DSM-5
The fifth edition of the Diagnostic and Statistical Manual of Mental Disorders, a widely used manual for diagnosing mental disorders, places obsessive-compulsive personality disorder under section II, under the "personality disorders" chapter, and defines it as: "a pervasive pattern of preoccupation with orderliness, perfectionism, and mental and interpersonal control, at the expense of flexibility, openness, and efficiency, beginning by early adulthood and present in a variety of contexts". A diagnosis of OCPD is only received when four out of the eight criteria are met.

The eight criteria of OCPD described in the DSM-5 (of which four are required to be present in a patient for a diagnosis) are:

 Preoccupation with details
 Perfectionism interfering with task completion
 Rigidity and stubbornness
 Reluctance to delegate
 Excessive conscientiousness and pedantry (excessive concern with minor details and rules)
 Workaholic behavior
 Miserliness (excessive desire to save money)
 Inability to discard worn-out or worthless objects

The list of criteria for the ICD-10 is similar, but does not include the last three criteria in the above list, and additionally includes the symptoms "intrusive thoughts" and "excessive doubt and caution" as criteria for diagnosis.

Alternative model for diagnosis
The DSM-5 also includes an alternative set of diagnostic criteria as per the dimensional model of conceptualizing personality disorders. Under the proposed set of criteria, a person only receives a diagnosis when there is an impairment in two out of four areas of one's personality functioning, and when there are three out of four pathological traits, one of which must be rigid perfectionism.

The patient must also meet the general criteria C through G for a personality disorder, which state that the traits and symptoms being displayed by the patient must be stable and unchanging over time with an onset of at least adolescence or early adulthood, visible in a variety of situations, not caused by another mental disorder, not caused by a substance or medical condition, and abnormal in comparison to a person's developmental stage and culture/religion.

Differential diagnosis
There are several mental disorders in the DSM-5 that are listed as differential diagnoses for OCPD. They are as follows:

 Obsessive–compulsive disorder. OCD and OCPD have a similar name which may cause confusion; however, OCD can be easily distinguished from OCPD: OCPD is not characterized by true obsessions or compulsions.
 Hoarding disorder.  A diagnosis of hoarding disorder is only considered when the hoarding behavior exhibited is causing severe impairment in the functioning of the person, such as an inability to access rooms in a house due to excessive hoarding.
 Narcissistic personality disorder.  Individuals with a narcissistic personality disorder usually believe that they have achieved perfection (especially compared to other people) and cannot get better, whereas those with OCPD do not believe that they have achieved perfection, and are self-critical. Those with NPD tend to be stingy and lack generosity; however, they are usually generous when spending on themselves, unlike those with OCPD who hoard money and are miserly on themselves and others.
 Antisocial personality disorder.  Similarly, individuals with antisocial personality disorder are not generous, but miserly around others, although they usually over-indulge themselves and are sometimes reckless in spending.
 Schizoid personality disorder.  Schizoid personality disorder and obsessive-compulsive personality disorder may both display restricted affectivity and coldness; however, in OCPD, this is usually due to a controlling attitude, whereas, in SPD, it occurs due to a lack of ability to experience emotion and display affection.
 Other personality traits.  Obsessive-compulsive personality traits may be particularly useful and helpful, especially in productive environments. Only when these traits become extreme, maladaptive, and cause clinically significant impairment in several aspects of one's life should a diagnosis of OCPD be considered. 
 Personality change due to another medical condition.  Obsessive–compulsive personality disorder must be differentiated from a personality change due to a medical condition, which affects the central nervous system, and may cause changes in behavior and traits.
 Substance use disorders. Substance use may cause the advent of obsessive-compulsive traits. It is necessary that this is distinguished from underlying and persistent behavior, which must occur when a person is not under influence of a substance.

ICD-10
The World Health Organization's ICD-10 uses the term . At least four of the following must be present:

 Feelings of doubt
 Perfectionism
 Excessive conscientiousness
 Checking and preoccupation with details
 Stubbornness 
 Caution 
 Rigidity
 Insistent and unwelcome thoughts or impulses that do not attain the severity of an obsessive-compulsive disorder.

Millon's subtypes
In his book, Personality Disorders in Modern Life, Theodore Millon describes 5 types of obsessive–compulsive personality disorder, which he shortened to compulsive personality disorder.

Comorbidity

Obsessive–compulsive disorder
OCPD is often confused with obsessive-compulsive disorder (OCD). Despite the similar names, they are two distinct disorders. Some OCPD individuals do have OCD, and the two can be found in the same family, sometimes along with eating disorders.

The rate of comorbidity of OCPD in patients with OCD is estimated to be around 15–28%. However, due to the addition of the hoarding disorder diagnosis in the DSM-5, and studies showing that hoarding may not be a symptom of OCPD, the true rate of comorbidity may be much lower.

There is significant similarity in the symptoms of OCD and OCPD, which can lead to complexity in distinguishing them clinically. For example, perfectionism is an OCPD criterion and a symptom of OCD if it involves the need for tidiness, symmetry, and organization. Hoarding is also considered both a compulsion found in OCD and a criterion for OCPD in the DSM-5. Even though OCD and OCPD are seemingly separate disorders there are obvious redundancies between the two concerning several symptoms.

Regardless of similarities between the OCPD criteria and the obsessions and compulsions found in OCD, there are discrete qualitative dissimilarities between these disorders, predominantly in the functional part of symptoms. Unlike OCPD, OCD is described as invasive, and stressful. Time-consuming obsessions and habits are aimed at reducing obsession-related stress. OCD symptoms are at times regarded as egodystonic because they are experienced as alien and repulsive to the person. Therefore, there is a greater mental anxiety associated with OCD.

In contrast, the symptoms seen in OCPD, although repetitive, are not linked with repulsive thoughts, images, or urges. OCPD characteristics and behaviors are known as ego-syntonic, as people with this disorder view them as suitable and correct. On the other hand, the main features of perfectionism and inflexibility can result in considerable suffering in an individual with OCPD as a result of the associated need for control.

The presence of OCPD in patients with OCD has been linked to a worse prognosis of OCD, especially when cognitive behavioral therapy was used. This may be due to the ego-syntonic nature of OCPD which may lead to the obsessions becoming aligned with one's personal values. In contrast, the trait of perfectionism may improve the outcome of treatment as patients are likely to complete homework assigned to them with determination. The findings with regards to pharmacological treatment has also been mixed, with some studies showing a lower reception to SRIs in OCD patients with comorbid OCPD, with others showing no relationship.

Comorbidity between OCD and OCPD has been linked to a more severe presentation of symptoms, a younger age of onset, more significant impairment in functioning, poorer insight, and higher comorbidity of depression and anxiety.

Autism spectrum disorder
There are considerable similarities and overlap between autism spectrum disorder (ASD) and OCPD, such as list-making, inflexible adherence to rules, and obsessive aspects of ASD, although the latter may be distinguished from OCPD especially regarding affective behaviors, worse social skills, difficulties with Theory of Mind and intense intellectual interests, e.g. an ability to recall every aspect of a hobby. A 2009 study involving adult autistic people found that 32% of those diagnosed with ASD met the diagnostic requirements for a comorbid OCPD diagnosis.

Eating disorders
Perfectionism has been linked with anorexia nervosa in research for decades. A researcher in 1949 described the behavior of the average "anorexic girl" as being "rigid" and "hyperconscious", observing a tendency to "[n]eatness, meticulosity, and a mulish stubbornness not amenable to reason [which] make her a rank perfectionist". So common are such traits as perfectionism and rigidity among anorectics, that they have been referred to in clinical literature as "classical childhood features of patients with anorexia nervosa" or classical premorbid personality descriptors of anorexia nervosa".

Regardless of the prevalence of the full-fledged OCPD among eating disordered samples, the presence of this personality disorder or its traits, such as perfectionism, has been found to be positively correlated with a range of complications in eating disorders and a negative outcome, as opposed to impulsive features—those linked with histrionic personality disorder, for example—which predict a better outcome from treatment. OCPD predicts more severe symptoms of anorexia nervosa, and worse remission rates, however, OCPD and perfectionistic traits predicted a higher acceptance of treatment, which was defined as undergoing 5 weeks of treatment.

People with anorexia nervosa who exercise excessively display a higher prevalence of several OCPD traits when compared to their counterparts who did not exercise excessively. The traits included self-imposed perfectionism, and the childhood OCPD traits of being rule-bound and cautious. It may be that people with OCPD traits are more likely to use exercise alongside restricting food intake in order to mitigate fears of increased weight, reduce anxiety, or reduce obsessions related to weight gain. Samples that had the childhood traits of rigidity, extreme cautiousness, and perfectionism endured more severe food restriction and higher levels of exercise and underwent longer periods of underweight status. It may be that OCPD traits are an indicator of a more severe manifestation of AN which is harder to treat.

Gambling Disorder 
A majority of those with lifelong gambling disorder have some sort of personality disorder, and the most common personality disorder amongst them is obsessive compulsive personality disorder. OCPD has a strong comorbidity with individuals who have gambling disorder. A study of data collected in the 2001-2002 National Epidemiologic Survey on Alcohol and Related Conditions looked at pathological gambling and psychiatric conditions as defined by the DSM-IV. Of the surveyed population consistent with gambling disorder, 60.8% also had a personality disorder, with OCPD appearing most frequently at 30%. About 300,000 U.S citizens have both a gambling disorder and obsessive compulsive personality disorder; and yet, there is little research on the comorbidity of the two disorders. Those with gambling disorders and OCPD do, indeed, exhibit different behavioral patterns than those with gambling disorders alone. More research on the relationship between the disorders is thought to help uncover causes and develop treatments for patients.

Mental Fatigue 
Recently, in 2020, the connection between mental fatigue and OCPD was published for the first time, even though mental fatigue has been previously associated with identified characteristics of OCPD such as workaholic behavior and perfectionism.

Other disorders and conditions
A diagnosis of OCPD is common with anxiety disorders, substance use disorders, and mood disorders. OCPD is also highly comorbid with Cluster A personality disorders,[4]
especially paranoid and schizotypal personality disorders.

OCPD is also linked to hypochondriasis, with some studies estimating a rate of co-occurrence as high as 55.7%.

Moreover, OCPD has been found to be very common among some medical conditions, including Parkinson's disease and the hypermobile subtype of Ehler-Danlos syndrome. The latter may be explained by the need for control that arises from musculoskeletal problems and the associated features that arise early in life, whilst the former can be explained by dysfunctions in the fronto-basal ganglia circuitry.

Treatment
The best-validated treatment for OCPD is cognitive therapy (CT) or cognitive behavioral therapy (CBT), with studies showing an improvement in areas of personality impairment, and reduced levels of anxiety and depression. Group CBT is also associated with an increase in extraversion and agreeableness and reduced neuroticism.  Interpersonal psychotherapy has been linked to even better results when it came to reducing depressive symptoms.

Epidemiology
Estimates for the prevalence of OCPD in the general population are 3%, making it the most common personality disorder. Current evidence is inconclusive as to whether OCPD is more common in men than women, or in equal rates among sexes. It is estimated to occur in 8.7% of psychiatric outpatient settings.

A study of data collected in the 2001-2002 National Epidemiologic Survey on Alcohol and Related Conditions looked specifically for seven personality disorders as defined by the DSM-IV. The study concluded the most prevalent personality disorder of the survey's population to be OCPD, at 7.88%. This study also concluded there were no gender differences in prevalence and that OCPD was not a predicter of disability.

History

In 1908, Sigmund Freud named what is now known as obsessive–compulsive or anankastic personality disorder "anal retentive character". He identified the main strands of the personality type as a preoccupation with orderliness, parsimony (frugality), and obstinacy (rigidity and stubbornness). The concept fits his theory of psychosexual development. Freud believed that the anal retentive character faced difficulties regulating the control of defecation, leading to repercussions by the parents, and it is the latter that would cause the anal retentive character.

Aubrey Lewis, in his 1936 book Problems of Obsessional Illness, suggests that anal-erotic characteristics are found in patients without obsessive thoughts, and proposed two types of obsessional personality, one melancholy and stubborn, the other uncertain and indecisive.

In the book Contributions to the theory of the anal character, Karl Abraham noted that the core feature of the anal character is being perfectionistic, and he believed that these traits will help an individual in becoming industrious and productive, whilst hindering their social and interpersonal functioning, such as working with others.

OCPD was included in the first edition of the Diagnostic and Statistical Manual of Mental Disorders in 1952 by the American Psychiatric Association under the name "compulsive personality". It was defined as a chronic and excessive preoccupation with adherence to rules and standards of conscience. Other symptoms included rigidity, over-conscientiousness, and a reduced ability to relax.

The DSM-II (1968) changed the name to "obsessive-compulsive personality", and also suggested the term "anankastic personality" in order to reduce confusion between OCPD and OCD, but the proposed name was removed from later editions. The symptoms described in the DSM-II closely resembled those in the original DSM.

In 1980, the DSM-III was released, and it renamed the disorder back to "compulsive personality disorder", and also included new symptoms of the disorder: a restricted expression of affect, and an inability to delegate tasks. Devotion to productivity, perfectionism, and indecisiveness were the other symptoms included. The DSM-III-R (1987) renamed the disorder again to "obsessive-compulsive personality disorder" and the name has remained since then. A diagnosis of OCPD was given when 5 of the 9 symptoms were met, and the 9 symptoms included perfectionism, preoccupation with details, an insistence that others submit to one's way, indecisiveness, devotion to work, restricted expression of affect, excessive conscientiousness, lack of generosity, and hoarding.

With DSM-IV, OCPD was classified as a 'Cluster C' personality disorder. There was a dispute about the categorization of OCPD as an Axis II anxiety disorder. Although the DSM-IV attempted to distinguish between OCPD and OCD by focusing on the absence of obsessions and compulsions in OCPD, OC personality traits are easily mistaken for abnormal cognitions or values considered to underpin OCD. The disorder is a neglected and understudied area of research.

See also

 Analysis paralysis
 Anal retentiveness
 Authoritarian personality
 Compulsive hoarding
 Germaphobia
 Jobsworth
 Pedantic
 Scrupulosity

References

Further reading
 Grant, John E., Obsessive-Compulsive Personality Disorder (2019). American Psychiatric Association Publishing.

External links

Cluster C personality disorders